Sofia Karlsson may refer to:

Sofia Karlsson (singer) (born 1975), Swedish folk singer
Sofia Jarl (née Karlsson, born 1977), Swedish politician
Sofia Karlsson (dancer) (born 1978), Swedish modern dancer